The city of Vancouver, British Columbia, has operated fireboats since 1928, when the city introduced the J.H. Carlisle.

At the time, the shores of False Creek were lined with industrial facilities, mainly sawmills. The owners of these businesses committed to pay for the construction of a fireboat provided it would be stationed in False Creek, as the boat's presence reduced the cost of their fire insurance. The new fireboat was named in honour of Vancouver's longest serving fire chief, John Howe Carlisle.

In 1951, the city launched its second fireboat, Fireboat No. 2. At the time it was considered one of the most powerful in the world.

The J.H. Carlisle was retired in 1971, while Fireboat No. 2 worked until 1987, at which time it was sold to the city of San Francisco. Renamed the Guardian, it was retired in 2022. 

Beginning in 1992, the city of Vancouver received five new fireboats. Designed by Robert Allan Ltd. and built by Celtic Shipyards, the new boats not only served Vancouver but operated throughout the Lower Mainland as part of a new consortium between the cities of Vancouver, Port Moody, Burnaby, and the city and district of North Vancouver.

By 2015, four of the 1992-built boats were still in service, but had exceeded their planned 20-year operational life. The vessels had such low pumping capacity that authorities would dispatch two boats to each fire. In 2016 it was announced that the city would receive two new fireboats built by MetalCraft Marine of Kingston, Ontario. The boats would replace three of the remaining 1992-built boats, while one would be kept as a reserve.

While the first of the new boats entered service in September 2016, the second boat caught fire during transport, delaying its delivery by several months. The fire on the second boat resulted in it being deemed a total loss, with a new boat being built to replace it. The replacement boat entered service roughly a year later.

Notable Events
On July 7, 1938, CPR Pier D caught fire. The J.H. Carlisle together with crews on land battled what was described as Vancouver's "most spectacular fire" for hours. At one point the heat grew so intense that four firefighters battling the blaze from a raft were forced to leap into the water after their hose was burned through.

On March 6, 1945, the freighter Greenhill Park exploded at a pier on Burrard Inlet. The blast killed 8 longshoremen, injured a further 19 and shattered windows across the city. With WWII still in its final stages, many initially thought the explosion was the result of a Japanese attack.

In 1959 the Norwegian freighter Ferngulf exploded in Burrard Inlet, killing two and seriously wounding several more. There was no intervention by the city's fireboats or other rescue personnel. An inquiry determined that the city's rules only allowed the fireboat to leave the city when directed to do so by the mayor. Changes were made to the Canada Shipping Act, empowering a "rescue coordinator" to order rescue vessels to sea.

On July 3, 1960, a fire broke out at the BC Forrest Products Mill on the south shore of False Creek, resulting in Vancouver's first five-alarm fire. The fire was contained, although most of the mill was burnt down before it could be extinguished.

On March 4, 2015, a fire broke out in a container containing trichloroisocyanuric acid at Port of Vancouver. Warnings were issued to people living in the vicinity to stay at home and lock their doors and windows to prevent toxic smoke from entering. Two fireboats attended, and together with crews on land, were able to extinguish the blaze with minimal damage.

List of Vancouver Fireboats

References

Municipal government of Vancouver
Vancouver
Transport in Greater Vancouver